Gusinoye is a rural locality (a selo) and the administrative center of Ozernovsky Selsoviet of Ikryaninsky District, Astrakhan Oblast, Russia. The population was 46 as of 2010. There is 1 street.

Geography 
Gusinoye is located 29 km west of Ikryanoye (the district's administrative centre) by road. Ozyornoye is the nearest rural locality.

References 

Rural localities in Ikryaninsky District